"Hell in Paradise" is a song by Yoko Ono from the 1985 album Starpeace. The lyrics are about mankind's perceived idea of hell, despite living in the paradise that Ono considers to be planet Earth. After "Walking on Thin Ice", it was her biggest hit of the 1980s, charting at number 16 on the US dance chart. Ono went on hiatus after Starpeace; this would be her last proper single until 2001's remix of "Open Your Box".

Ultimate Classic Rock critic Michael Gallucci rated it as Ono's 4th best song, calling it the "highlight" of Starpeace.

In 2004, the track was revived as part of the ONO remix project, and reached number 4 on the same chart twenty years on. In 2016, the song was re-released by the ONO project again, featuring remixes by Dave Audé and others. It reached number 1 on the Dance Club Songs chart.

Music video
The video was directed by Polish filmmaker Zbigniew Rybczyński. It stars Ono alongside Michael J. Anderson, Peter Risch, Daniel Richards, and Christopher Greener. The music video won the award "Most Innovative Video" at Billboard Music Video Awards in 1986.

Track listing
US 7" single
"Hell in Paradise"
"Hell in Paradise" (Instrumental)

US 12" single 
A1. "Hell in Paradise" (Club Version) – 6:52
B1. "Hell in Paradise" (Dub Version) – 8:52
B2. "Hell in Paradise" (Single Version) - 3:34

12" single (2004)
A1. "Hell in Paradise" (Murk Miami Mix) 
A2. "Hell in Paradise" (Orange Factory "Hot As..." Mix)
B1. "Hell in Paradise" (Chus & Ceballos Iberican Mix)
B2. "Hell in Paradise" (Minge Binge Club Mix)

Digital Download (2004)
"Hell in Paradise" (Murk Miami Mix) - 8:11
"Hell in Paradise" (Orange Factory "Hot As..." Mix) - 7:45
"Hell in Paradise" (Chus & Ceballos Iberican Mix) - 10:07
"Hell in Paradise" (Minge Binge Club Mix) - 7:18
"Hell in Paradise" (Chris the Greek Club Mix) - 6:55
"Hell in Paradise" (Chris the Greek Radio Edit) - 3:53

Charts

References

Yoko Ono songs
1985 singles
2004 singles
Song recordings produced by Yoko Ono
Songs written by Yoko Ono
1985 songs
Polydor Records singles